People Make Games (PMG) is a British investigative video game journalism YouTube channel. The channel focuses on the developers and people who make video games. People Make Games has reported on topics like video game crunch, outsourcing, and worker exploitation.

History 
The group was created by Chris Bratt and Anni Sayers in 2018, who were previously both journalists who had worked for Eurogamer. Sayers creates the graphics. Quintin Smith, a journalist from Rock Paper Shotgun, joined in 2020. Additional funding comes from Loading Bar, a chain of bars in London and Brighton.

Notable reports

Roblox 
In a video published in August 2021, Smith accused Roblox'''s parent company, Roblox Corporation, of exploiting the platform's young game developers. Smith argues the revenue split is significantly less favourable toward developers than other video game marketplaces, and players are incentivized to keep all ingame currency, which Smith likened to scrip, on Roblox by having high minimum withdrawal amounts and low exchange rates. In a followup video released in December 2021 titled "Roblox Pressured Us to Delete Our Video. So We Dug Deeper.", he further accused the platform of having child safety issues and criticized its "collectibles stock market" by likening it to gambling.

 Annapurna Interactive 
In March 2022, the channel reported on three video game studios publishing under Annapurna Interactive — Mountains, Fullbright, and Funomena. In all three cases, employees reportedly reached out to Annapurna Interactive, addressing concerns regarding abuse and a toxic work environment being created by the studio founders. In hopes of getting Annapurna Interactive to mediate, employees stated that the publisher was siding mostly with the founders in question. According to one former studio employee, representatives of Annapurna Interactive had been quoted responding that "without strong personalities, games don't get made." Bratt described these incidents as part of a greater pattern of auteur culture that can be found across the independent film and video game industry. Following the video, Robin Hunicke, one of the heads of Funomena, issued a Twitter apology, before stating to staff alongside Funomena co-founder Martin Middleton that there would be layoffs at Funomena and that the studio would likely close due to the video and its impact on the studio's ability to secure outside funding.
CS:GO skin gambling
In November 2022, PMG reported on skin gambling in Counter-Strike: Global Offensive and argued that the company generally avoided taking action on gambling websites using their game, thus "facilitating unregulated gambling by children".

 See also 
 Game Maker's Toolkit''

References 

Video game critics
English YouTubers
Video gaming in the United Kingdom
Investigative journalism
Patreon creators
YouTube channels launched in 2018
Gaming-related YouTube channels
English-language YouTube channels